Gabriele Tinti may refer to:

 Gabriele Tinti (actor) (1932–1991), Italian actor
 Gabriele Tinti (poet) (born 1979), Italian writer